Temple High School is a public high school located in Temple, Texas, United States. As of the 2018–2020 biennial realignment, it is classified as a 6A school by the UIL. It is part of the Temple Independent School District located in central Bell County. In 2015, the school was rated "Met Standard" by the Texas Education Agency.

Temple High School became an International Baccalaureate authorized school in 1992 and is currently one of 46 IB authorized high schools in Texas. To date, Temple High School has awarded over 100 IB diplomas.

History of racial segregation in Temple education system

The "Temple Colored School" was established in 1885, and in 1912 a two-story building was erected with eleven classrooms, a science lab, and a principal's office. The first high school was organized in 1915, and in 1925 was renamed Dunbar High School. In 1952, the Dunbar High School campus was opened and served as a high school until 1968, when mandatory desegregation was implemented and the school was merged with Temple High School. The former Dunbar High School campus was renamed to Meridith Junior High in memory of G. C. Meridith who served as principal for more than 2 decades, and in 1970 Meridith-Dunbar became an elementary school.

In a 2014 article from the Killeen Daily Herald, a former Dunbar High School student recalled the inequalities that existed in resources between the two schools. She remembered receiving second-hand textbooks from Temple High School and being shocked by how black senators were depicted in the social studies books. “The sad thing is that our teachers, who were very capable, were not picked up by the system," she remarked about the transition to desegregation.

The Dunbar Panthers football team was coached by Curtis B. Elliott, and they won the state championship in 1939. Coach Elliott coached at Dunbar High School for 36 years.

Arts 
The Temple High School theater department is a program with a 30-year streak as district UIL One-Act Play champions. The department has advanced to the UIL 5A State One-Act Play competition 7 times, winning in 2007 and 2016.

Athletics
The 11,500-capacity Wildcat Stadium is the main stadium. The Temple Wildcats compete in the following sports:

 Baseball
 Basketball
 Cross country
 Football
 Golf
 Powerlifting
 Soccer
 Softball
 Swimming
 Tennis
 Track and field
 Volleyball
 Marching Band

State titles
Temple (UIL)
 Football
 1979 (4A), 1992 (5A/D2)
 Boys' basketball
 1932 (All)
 One-act play
 2007 (5A), 2016 (5A)

Temple Dunbar (PVIL)

 Boys' basketball
 1958 (PVIL-3A)
 Boys' track
 1953 (PVIL-2A)

Football history 
The Temple Wildcats have a history in football. As of the end of the 2017 football season, the school is ranked fourth behind Highland Park, Amarillo, and Plano in the state of Texas for total games won with 753.

State Championships (2): 1979 (4A), 1992 (5A Div. 2)

State Championship Game Appearances (9): 1940 (2A), 1941 (2A), 1951 (3A), 1952 (3A), 1976 (4A), 1979 (4A), 1992 (5A Div. 2), 2014 (5A Div. 1), 2016 (5A Div. 1)

Additional Football Statistics
State Quarterfinalists (10)
Regional Champions (13)
Area Champions (13)
Bi-District Champions (23)
District Champions (34)
Playoff appearances (41)

Notable alumni
 Ki Aldrich, first pick of the 1939 NFL Draft, NFL center for the Chicago Cardinals and Washington Redskins
 "Mean" Joe Greene, Hall of Fame NFL defensive tackle for the Pittsburgh Steelers (attended racially segregated Dunbar High School)
 Jonathan Bane, football player
 Bryan Burrough, American author and journalist
 Daniel Lee Corwin, American serial killer executed in 1998
 Kenneth Davis, NFL running back for the Buffalo Bills
Bobby Dillon, Hall of Fame NFL safety
 Danny Dunn, a mayor of Temple, Texas
 Brad Dusek, NFL linebacker for the Washington Redskins
 Rufus Granderson, AFL defensive tackle for the Dallas Texans
 Jennifer Hopens, a two-day Jeopardy champion
 George Koch, American football player
 Dan Pope, mayor of Lubbock since 2016
Brian Floca, American writer and illustrator of children's books, Caldecott Medal Award winner
Britt Daniel, co-founder, lead singer and guitarist of the alt-rock band Spoon

References

External links
 Temple ISD
 Temple High School (archive)

High schools in Bell County, Texas
Public high schools in Texas
1883 establishments in Texas